The Church of Santa María la Real (Spanish: Iglesia de Santa María la Real) is a medieval church located in Sangüesa, Spain. 
The architecture represents a transitional style between Romanesque and Gothic.

Conservation 
Since 1889 it has been protected by a heritage listing, currently Bien de Interés Cultural.

See also 
 List of Bien de Interés Cultural in Navarre

References

External links 

Bien de Interés Cultural landmarks in Navarre
Churches in Navarre